Josh Cahill (born 17 June 1986) is a German-Czech aviation vlogger and airline critic who presents airline reviews on his YouTube channel. He is reportedly one of the most-watched flight reviewers on YouTube. He organised Afghanistan's first all-female flight together with Kam Air in February 2021 on a flight from Herat to Kabul for which he received the Aviation Achievement Award. He is also a blogger.

Early life 
Josh Cahill was born to a German father and a Czech mother in Australia. His grandmother is Ukrainian. His mother came to Germany as a refugee in the 1980's from Czechoslovakia. He grew up in a small village called Mildenau.

Career 

Cahill started travelling in 2005 with his first trip to Lithuania.

In 2009, he hitchhiked from Germany to Iran, stating that "getting lost in Iran" has changed his life as well as his perspective on travel. In 2013, Cahill founded his award-winning blog Go Travel Your Way, with a strong focus on airline reviews and less common destinations. He received some media attention for visiting Afghanistan as a tourist in 2015 as well as to North Korea in 2017, which he described as one of his most exciting trips to date.

In July 2015, Cahill posted his first flight review on his YouTube channel and has since received over 100 million views, making him one of the most watched flight reviewers on the internet. He flies at an average of 150 times per year, and has travelled to more than 100 countries. His most-watched review has over 21 million views.

In 2018, Cahill won "Best Airline Channel" at the TBC Asia Travel Blogger Awards.

On 22 December 2020, Cahill was part of the delivery of Uganda Airlines first Airbus A330-800 from Toulouse to Entebbe led by General Katumba Wamala, the then Ugandan Minister of Works and Transport and received by Uganda's President Yoweri Museveni.

On 24 February 2021, Cahill documented Afghanistan’s first all-female crew flight on Kam Air which he helped to organise. The airlines first female Afghan pilot, 22-year-old Mohadese Mirzaee, joined Captain Veronica Borysova from Ukraine in piloting the Boeing 737-500 from Hamid Karzai International Airport in Kabul to Herat. The flight took 90 minutes. Cahill described the moment as historic, "given that during the Taliban occupation, women [in Afghanistan] had no rights". The event made global headlines, and was featured on the BBC, DW and the Business Insider. It was later revealed that both the airline and Cahill received threats by the Taliban, who were opposed to the idea.

In April 2021, Cahill received the AeroTime Aviation Achievement Award 2021 for covering the Kam Air flight and "In recognition of his dedication to the aviation industry, for his focus on equality and to promoting diversity and inclusion in the sector." The award was presented to him by former EU Ambassador to Afghanistan, Vygaudas Ušackas.

Malaysia Airlines 
In 2018, Cahill posted a Malaysia Airlines review, claiming that he was bullied by the cabin crew on a flight from Kuala Lumpur to London for sharing his thoughts and criticisms on Instagram during the flight, using the inflight wi-fi. According to Cahill, the crew confronted him for the Instagram post and refused to provide him any more service, including food and water, on the 14-hour flight unless he stopped filming. The review was watched over two million times and picked up by media outlets such as the Sun and news.com.au.

He received an apology email from CEO Izham Ismail; Cahill said that it was a "template email," and that "it was clearly to prevent me from getting more footage and create a bad review on my channel."

Singapore Airlines 
On 7 January 2020, Cahill posted an 11-minute review of his Singapore Airlines (SQ) flight from London to Singapore. He said that the cabin crew was "the biggest let down" of the flight," specifically that they had "zero engagement policy." He said that it was "not worth the dollar," but reassured that "it's a brilliant product."

The video was featured in various news outlets, causing Cahill to face a backlash on social media. Some asked him not to "judge or make conclusions based on one flight," while another recommends business or first class for a more personalised service.

He also received racist and abusive comments, including one by someone claiming to be a Singapore Airlines crew member who threatened his life and stated that the entire crew hated him. There had been over 100 abusive messages on social media as quoted by Today. Cahill responded with, "All I provided was honest feedback based on my experiences." Cahill said that he had been in touch with authorities asking for the account holder making the death threat to be tracked. The authorities responded by saying that if the allegations are true, "appropriate actions will be taken."

It was revealed that Cahill's then-girlfriend was a Singapore Airlines cabin crew member; she had also been messaged asking if she was sure she intended to continue engaging with Cahill. She said that there is "nothing wrong with speaking the truth".

Must Share A News, a news publication, said that the backlash was due to "Singaporeans having a misplaced sense of nationalism" over their flag carrier. It also suggested that Singaporeans should not be overambitious with their airline.

Tunisair 
In 2020, Cahill flew on board a Tunisair Airbus A330, and shared his "unpleasant experience" at its lounge at Tunis-Carthage International Airport as well as onboard. Central director of communication Sami Blidi said that certain services were closed to the public amid the COVID-19 pandemic. Blidi also criticized Cahill for not wearing a face mask as part of health protocols, and said that the lounge isn't open until 05:00.

Cahill then took to Instagram to criticize Blidi's allegations, saying that he entered the lounge at 05:15. Those claims were later backed by the online news channel AJ+ which published screenshots that showed Cahill inside the lounge at 05:17. He received great support on the Internet for exposing the airline.

Later on, Tunisian actor Dhaffer L'Abidine joined Cahill's efforts by posting a video on his Instagram channel too, showing a broken and dirty seat. He posted "the best way to fight this incompetence and corruption is to reveal the truth".

In 2021, a year after his first video, Cahill reviewed Tunisair again. This time from Istanbul to Tunis on an Airbus A320, calling the airline a "national embarrassment". The cabin appeared broken and run down, among other flaws. Upon arrival at Tunis International Airport he was interrogated by five police officers due to his previous video, asking him to hand over his camera, which he refused.

Vistara 
On 3 March 2022, Cahill published an investigative video titled The Truth about Vistara - Bribes, Lies and Whistleblowers which revealed internal communication of Vistara staff and crew members accusing the Indian airline of corruption, bribery and sexual exploitation. The video drew the airline to make a statement on its social media channels, denying the claims made by its employees. Vistara also said it started an internal investigation.

Awards and recognition 

 Best Airline Channel at the TBC Asia Travel Bloggers Award 2018.
 AeroTime Aviation Achievement Award 2021

References

External links 

 Official YouTube channel
 Official website

1986 births
Living people
German bloggers
Male bloggers
German YouTubers
University of Melbourne alumni
YouTube travel vloggers